Herbert John Butler Hollings  (18 June 1855 – 6 March 1922) was an English first-class cricketer and barrister.

The son of John Hollings, he was born in June 1855 at Manningham, Yorkshire. He was educated at Winchester College, before going up to Corpus Christi College, Oxford. While studying at Oxford, he made a single appearance in first-class cricket for Oxford University against the Marylebone Cricket Club at Oxford in 1877. Batting twice in the match, he was dismissed without scoring in both Oxford innings' by Fred Morley and Robert Clayton respectively.

A student of the Inner Temple, he was called to the bar in 1881. He became a justice of the peace for Surrey in 1884. Hollings married Nine Augusta Stacey in 1886, with the couple having a son who was killed in the First World War. He died at Bournemouth in March 1922.

References

External links

1855 births
1922 deaths
Cricketers from Bradford
People educated at Winchester College
Alumni of Corpus Christi College, Oxford
English cricketers
Oxford University cricketers
Members of the Inner Temple
English barristers
English justices of the peace